This list of compositions by Paul Manz includes all the published choral and organ works by American composer Paul Manz.

Choral

Organ

References

Classical church music